Spragueia leo, the common spragueia, is a moth of the family Noctuidae. The species was first described by Achille Guenée in 1852. It is found in North America from Ontario, Manitoba and south-eastern Massachusetts, south to Florida, west to Texas and Kansas.

Adults are on wing from June to September. The larvae feed on Convolvulus species.

External links

Acontiinae
Moths of North America